Sirat is a town and commune in Mostaganem Province, Algeria. It is located in Bouguirat District. According to the 1998 census it has a population of 17,979. It lies on the N23 road.

References

Communes of Mostaganem Province
Algeria
Cities in Algeria